KFGO (790 kHz) is an AM radio station in the United States. Licensed to Fargo, North Dakota, KFGO broadcasts a news and talk radio format serving the Fargo-Moorhead metropolitan area, branded "The Mighty 790, 94.1, and 104.7". The station is currently owned by Midwest Communications Inc. All the offices and studios are located at 1020 S. 25th Street in Fargo, while its transmitter array is located north of Oxbow. It is an affiliate of the CBS Radio Network. KFGO is simulcast on KFGO-FM (104.7 FM) and translator K231CV (94.1 FM).

Due to its transmitter power and North Dakota's flat land (with near-perfect ground conductivity), KFGO's provides at least secondary coverage to most of eastern half of North Dakota, northwest Minnesota, northeast South Dakota, and southern Manitoba (a Canadian province). Its coverage area includes Grand Forks, North Dakota, Bemidji, Minnesota, Winnipeg, Manitoba, and Aberdeen, South Dakota.

Programming
KFGO broadcasts hourly news updates from CBS News Radio. On weekdays, KFGO has live, local talk shows daily from 5 a.m. to 7 p.m., including News and Views hosted by former state senator Joel Heitkamp from 8 to 11 a.m. During the overnight hours, KFGO broadcasts Premiere Networks' Coast to Coast AM and Westwood One's First Light.

Weekends have a variety of local and national programs. On Saturday mornings from 4 to 11 a.m., KFGO plays classic country music on The Solid Gold Saturday Morning. KFGO also produces weekend lifestyle programming about topics such as outdoor living and technology and has a trivia quiz show on Saturdays. CBS News programming is also broadcast on weekends, including the CBS News Weekend Roundup, Face the Nation, and Eye on Veterans.

Sports coverage
Minnesota Twins baseball
Minnesota Vikings football
Minnesota Wild hockey
North Dakota Fighting Hawks football, men's basketball, and men's ice hockey

Awards
KFGO has won two Peabody Awards, one for their coverage of a blizzard in 1984 and one in 1997 for their coverage of the 1997 Red River flood.

References

External links
FCC History Cards for KFGO
KFGO website

FGO
News and talk radio stations in the United States
Radio stations established in 1948
1948 establishments in North Dakota
Midwest Communications radio stations